Vikas Gupta is an Indian politician from Fatehpur, Uttar Pradesh, affiliated with Bhartiya Janata Party. He is member of the Uttar Pradesh Legislative Assembly, elected in 2017.

References

Year of birth missing (living people)
Living people
Bharatiya Janata Party politicians from Uttar Pradesh
Uttar Pradesh MLAs 2017–2022
Uttar Pradesh MLAs 2022–2027